Horaga albimacula, the violet onyx, is a species of lycaenid or blue butterfly found in the Indomalayan realm.

Subspecies
H. a. albimacula Andamans
H. a. viola Moore, 1882 Sikkim, Assam, India, Ceylon, Burma
H. a. anara Fruhstorfer, 1898 Java
H. a. bellula Fruhstorfer, 1897 Sumbawa
H. a. albistigmata Moulton, 1912 northern Borneo (Swarawak, Madihit Hills)
H. a. anytus (Staudinger, 1889) Palawan
H. a. triumphalis Murayama & Sibatani, 1943 Taiwan
H. a. ohkuboi Hayashi, 1984 Nias

See also
List of butterflies of India
List of butterflies of India (Lycaenidae)

Cited references

References

  
 
 
 
 

Horaga
Fauna of Pakistan
Taxa named by James Wood-Mason
Butterflies described in 1881